Red Bird is an American Western web series. Created by Misti Boland and Jeremy Osbern, the series stars Alexandra Goodman, Ian Stark, Armin Shimerman, Kitty Swink, Mike McShane, and John Prosky. The series of eight three to five minute episodes premiered on YouTube and the show's website in March 2016.

Tubefilter, in their Indie Spotlight, described the series as "a female revenge tale featuring Kitty Mae, who is seeking to get even with the gunman who killed her only son in cold blood."

The Daily Dot issued a positive review of the series, noting that from "costumes to locations to an original soundtrack that has presence and bite, it looks and sounds just as you’d imagine the creators—husband and wife Jeremy Osbern and Misti Boland—desired it." But the reviewer also longed for more time with each episode, stating that episodes "are centered around single set pieces or scenes that although well-scripted and shot, are short, mostly coming in at around three minutes."

Red Bird was shot on location and on sets in Colorado and Kansas and incorporated real horses, authentic old west set pieces, and practical gunshot and blood effects.

History
The story is loosely based on the Lawrence massacre of 1863, when William Quantrill murdered upwards of 200 men and boys in Lawrence, Kansas. Osbern and Boland cited living in Lawrence and reflecting on the history of Bleeding Kansas as an inspiration for creating the series.

Cast
 Alexandra Goodman as Kitty Mae
 Ian Stark as Thomas
 Armin Shimerman as Max
 Kitty Swink as Mary
 Michael McShane as Sam
 John Prosky as Bloody Bill

Episodes

Awards and nominations

References

External links
 
 Exclusive Interview with Director Misti Boland for Web Series ‘RED BIRD’
 A conversation with the creators of 'Red Bird,' a new kind of Western
 Spotlight: Misti Boland | Red Bird
 Inside The 'Red Bird' Series

Crowdfunded web series
2016 web series debuts
Western (genre) web series
American drama web series
YouTube original programming